The 2020 MLR Collegiate Draft was the first of its kind for rugby union in North America. On April 8, 2020, the MLR announced that on June 13, 2020, they will host their first collegiate MLR Draft. All of the participating teams for the 2021 season, except the Toronto Arrows, participated in the draft.

Format

Major League Rugby first ever Collegiate Draft was held on June 13, 2020. 
 
The Draft consisted of four rounds and the order of selection was determined by the inverse order of standings from the abbreviated 2020 Season from COVID-19, with expansion teams placed at the head of it. Once selected, teams used a "draft-and-follow" approach and had until one MLR season after the player's collegiate eligibility ended, to reach an agreement with the athlete.

Players must have played U.S. collegiate rugby in the one year preceding the draft (between June 13, 2019 to June 12, 2020); AND
Must have completed three years of college OR be at least 21 years of age. These criteria allow for athletes who have completed their Junior year to declare for the Draft while continuing to play in Collegiate competition as long as they remain eligible.

Hosts
MLR analyst Dan Power and MLR reporter Dani Wexelman were hosts of the Draft, and were joined by Stacy Paetz, sideline reporter for MLR games and host of MLR All-Access.

Player selections

References

Major League Rugby Draft
2020 in American rugby union
MLR Draft